Aalter is a municipality located between Bruges and Ghent in the Belgian province of East Flanders. It is bordered on the north by Maldegem, on the east by Zomergem and Nevele, on the south by Deinze, and on the west by the province of West Flanders. The mayor is Pieter De Crem.

Effective 1 January 2019, the municipality of Knesselare was merged into Aalter. Aalter was home to 29,242 people in 2021.

History 
Aalter is located on the border of the Meetjesland with the forest of Flanders. The area was inhabited since prehistory. Artefacts have been recovered from 3,000 to 2,000 BC. The village was first mentioned in 1974 as "Villa Haleftra". The etymology is unclear. The current name started to emerge around 1700. Aalter to home to several small heerlijkheden (landed estates) some of which had motte-and-bailey castles.

In 1838, a railway station opened and Aalter started to developed into a town which nowadays has many commuters.

Gallery

See also
 Pieter De Crem
 Flor Grammens

References

External links
 
  - Only available in Dutch

 
Municipalities of East Flanders